Rocrail is a freeware software package for controlling a model train layout from one or more computers. Users can run trains directly from a computer, or have some run automatically with manual control for any others.

Architecture
Rocrail uses a client-server architecture that communicates via TCP/IP, and the client and server do not need to be on the same computer. Rocrail can be used from a single computer connected directly to the layout, or via any other computer on a home network, or over the Internet. Rocrail also has an HTTP interface, which will let the layout run from a web browser. PDA and smartphone apps are available.

The server program runs on a computer connected to the layout by one of the standard computer interface setups, and supports many command stations.

The Rocrail client connects to the server over a network. The client can also be used by itself to plan layouts. There is no need for the server or the layout to be running to edit plans. Plans can be uploaded to the server after creation.

Rocrail runs under both the Windows and Linux operating systems, using the Wxwidgets toolkit.

A partial list of supported command stations and protocols
 Dinamo track driver system
 Digitrax LocoNet
 Easydcc
 ESU ECoS
 Hornby Elite (XPressNet)
 Lenz Elektronik XPressNet
 Littfinski HSI88
 Märklin 6050/6051 and Central Station 1 & 2
 OpenDCC
 RocoNet
 Roco/Fleischmann Z21
 Selectrix
 SRCP connections such as DDL and Roc-Pi
 Uhlenbrock's Intellibox
 Z21
 Zimo

Features 
 Automatic and manual modes
 Modular layout support
 Built-in DCC/MM Digital Direct Control Station
 Operates unlimited digital systems simultaneously
 Only one feedback contact per block required
 Runs on Linux, Mac OS X and Microsoft Windows systems beginning with Windows 9x
 Multilanguage support
 Symbol themes in SVG
 Fiddle Yard support
 PDA and Smartphone apps 
 Java client
 Up to four Gamepads can be used as throttles
 Built in DCC programmer (Rocpro)
 Raspberry Pi (Model B) supported

Users
Many users have already registered themselves at the Rocrail Forum. Some of them are actively translating the Wiki into their own language. Others are developing open-source hardware to contribute to the project.

Open source 
Rocrail was released under GPL v3, but during September 2015 its license was changed to a proprietary model.

References

External links 
 Project Page at Launchpad
 Rocrail Forum
 OpenDCC
 Dinamo(NL)
 list of supported command stations
 list of supported operating systems

Digital model train control
Software companies of Germany
Software that uses wxWidgets